Seymour "Buzz" Kulik (July 23, 1922 – January 13, 1999) was an American film director and producer. He directed 72 films and television shows, including the landmark CBS television network anthology series Playhouse 90 and several episodes of The Twilight Zone. Kulik went on to direct made-for-tv movies, such as Brian's Song. He was also the television adviser for Edmund Muskie during his 1972 campaign for President.

Filmography

 Collector's Item (1958 TV film)
 Perry Mason Case of the Pint-Sized Client (1958 TV)
 The Explosive Generation (1961)
 Kings of Broadway (1962 TV film)
 The Yellow Canary (1963)
 Ready for the People (1964)
 Kentucky Jones (1964–1965 TV series)
 Warning Shot (1967)
 Campo 44 (1967 television pilot film)
 Sergeant Ryker (1968, shot in 1963 as a television feature)
 Villa Rides (1968)
 Riot (1969)
 A Storm in Summer (1970)
 Vanished (1971 TV miniseries)
 Brian's Song (1971 TV film)
 To Find a Man (1972)
 Crawlspace (1972 TV film, uncredited)
 The Man Who Came to Dinner (1972 TV film)
 Incident on a Dark Street (1973 TV film)
 Shamus (1973)
 Portrait: A Man Whose Name Was John (1973 TV film)
 Pioneer Woman (1973 TV film)
 Remember When (1974 TV film)
 Bad Ronald (1974 TV film)
 Cage Without a Key (1975 TV film)
 Babe (1975 TV film)
 The Lindbergh Kidnapping Case (1976 TV film)
 Never Con a Killer (made-for-TV film pilot for TV series The Feather and Father Gang) (1977)
 Corey: For the People (1977 TV film)
 Kill Me If You Can (1977 TV film)
 Ziegfeld: The Man and His Women (1978 TV film)
 From Here to Eternity (1979)
 The Hunter (1980)
 The Pursuit of D.B. Cooper (1981) (uncredited)
 Rage of Angels (1983 TV film)
 George Washington (1984 TV miniseries)
 Kane & Abel (1985 TV miniseries)
 Women of Valor (1986 TV film)
 Her Secret Life (1987 TV film)
 Too Young the Hero (1988 TV film)
 Around the World in 80 Days (1989-1990 TV miniseries)
 Lucky Chances (1990 TV miniseries)
 Miles from Nowhere (1992 TV film)

References

External links

1922 births
1999 deaths
People from Kearny, New Jersey
Film producers from New Jersey
American television directors
20th-century American businesspeople
Film directors from New Jersey